Jo-Ann Cindy Strauss (born 3 February 1981 in Cape Town) is a South African model, public speaker and businesswoman. In 2001, she represented her country as Miss South Africa at the Miss Universe pageant in Puerto Rico as well as at the Miss World pageant hosted at Sun City in her home country in 2001. She was featured in the 2001 music video of the Irish pop group Westlife's single "When You're Looking Like That".

Career

Strauss obtained her bachelor's degree at the Stellenbosch University. During her reigning year as Miss South Africa, she started her media career with the Afrikaans TV magazine programme Pasella before anchoring the English lifestyle magazine show Top Billing (TV show), for which she has interviewed the likes of Charlize Theron, Antonio Banderas and George Clooney. She featured as cover girl for many South African magazines.

A year after Strauss was crowned Miss South Africa, she took part in the first and only celebrity version of Celebrity Big Brother (South African TV series), where she finished runner-up.

In 2010, Jo-Ann presented the opening ceremony for the 2010 FIFA World Cup in South Africa for the German television network ZDF along with Thomas Gottschalk in a live broadcast from Johannesburg on 10 June.

Social Projects
In 2008, Strauss spearheaded the Princess Project to give deserving young ladies the chance to go to their "Matric Balls" or "Proms" in designer dresses previously owned by South Africa's top celebrities. The idea behind her initiative was born of the fact that she herself went to her Matric Dance in a "previously-loved" designer dress which she bought with her mother at a second-hand store.

Strauss is one of South Africa's most respected media personalities and uses her profile and influence to help various initiatives. Her Princess Project has been supported by many South African and now international stars and has given dresses to over 80 young ladies thus far with the help of SA's top magazines YOU, Huisgenoot and Drum as well as Top Billing.

She partnered with the International Fashion Sale in 2010 and reached even more deserving young ladies in SA. Similar initiatives exist around the world, enabling young girls to feel like modern princesses.

In 2014, Strauss was appointed a Celebrity Advocate for international child rights organization, the United Nations Children's Fund (UNICEF) in South Africa.

Awards and achievements
Top Achiever in Class of "1995"
Awarded the Duku Duku-Award for style
Crowned Miss South Africa 2000.

References

External links 
 Official Web Site
 Abridged German version in PDF-format (178 KB)
  
 International Fashion Sale
 Top Billing Official Web Site

1981 births
Living people
Miss South Africa winners
Miss Universe 2001 contestants
Miss World 2001 delegates
People from Cape Town
South African businesspeople
South African female models
South African television personalities
Stellenbosch University alumni
UNICEF Goodwill Ambassadors